Ridgewood Park may refer to:
 Ridgewood Park, California, a community in California
 Ridgewood Park (Tampa), a neighborhood within the City of Tampa, Florida
 Ridgewood Park (baseball ground), a former baseball ground in Ridgewood, New York
 Ridgewood Park, Dallas, Texas, a neighborhood in East Dallas, Texas
 Mafera Park in Queens, New York City, formerly called Ridgewood Park